Dorothy Nimmo (1932 in Manchester – 24 May 2001) was a British poet, winner of the Cholmondeley Award in 1996.

Life
Educated in York and Cambridge, Nimmo worked as an actress in London before spending the 1960s in Geneva, returning to England in 1970 and living in Peterborough. In 1980, she divorced. In 1989, she gained an MA in creative writing from Lancaster University.

She stayed at the Pendle Hill Quaker Center for Study and Contemplation. She was caretaker of the Friends Meeting House in Gloucester, and the Friends Meeting House in Settle, Yorkshire.

Her work appeared in Stand, Thumbscrew, Areté Magazine, and Oxford Poetry.

Nimmo won awards at the Cardiff, Bridport, South Manchester and Prema competitions. She was guest poet at the Aldeburgh Festival in November 1995, and won the Cholmondeley Award in 1996.

Works
 AnneKate Friedlander, Beloit Poetry Journal, Volume39, Number 3, Spring 1989]

References

External links
 "Dorothy Nimmo's poems"
 "Dorothy Nimmo", That is Poetry

1932 births
2001 deaths
English women poets
Alumni of Lancaster University
British Quakers
Quaker writers
Women religious writers
20th-century English poets
20th-century English women writers